Events from the year 1994 in Taiwan. This year is numbered Minguo 83 according to the official Republic of China calendar.

Incumbents
 President – Lee Teng-hui
 Vice President – Li Yuan-tsu
 Premier – Lien Chan
 Vice Premier – Hsu Li-teh

Events

March
 1 March – The opening of the civil section of Kinmen Airport in Kinmen County.
 13 March – The opening of Kaohsiung Museum of Shadow Puppet in Gangshan Township, Kaohsiung County.

June
 9 June – The opening of Shung Ye Museum of Formosan Aborigines in Taipei.

August
 6 August – The establishment of Lee Tze-fan Memorial Art Gallery in Hsinchu City.

September
 1 September
 The establishment of CTi International.
 The establishment of CTi Variety.
 16 September – The 6.8  Taiwan Strait earthquake occurred.

November
 28 – The establishment of Pingtung Airport in Pingtung County.

Births
 24 April – Tsao Yu-ning, actor
 3 October – Tseng Jen-ho, baseball player
 4 November – Huang Yun-wen, taekwondo athlete

References

 
Years of the 20th century in Taiwan